Brian A. Barsky is a professor at the University of California, Berkeley, working in computer graphics and geometric modeling as well as in optometry and vision science.  He is a Professor of Computer Science and Vision Science and an Affiliate Professor of Optometry.  He is also a member of the Joint Graduate Group in Bioengineering, an inter-campus program, between UC Berkeley and UC San Francisco.

Early life and education
Barsky holds a Ph.D. in computer science from the University of Utah in Salt Lake City, an M.S. in computer graphics and computer science from Cornell University in Ithaca, and a D.C.S. in engineering and a B.Sc. in mathematics and computer science from McGill University in Montreal.

Career
Barsky was a visiting professor at Yale-NUS College in Singapore, in the Department of Computer Graphics and Multimedia in the Faculty of Information Technology at the Brno University of Technology in the Czech Republic, in the Machine Vision and Pattern Recognition Laboratory at the Lappeenranta University of Technology in Finland, at the Laboratoire d'Informatique Fondamentale de Lille (LIFL) of l'Université des Sciences et Technologies de Lille (USTL), at the Hong Kong University of Science and Technology in Hong Kong, at the University of Otago in Dunedin, New Zealand, in the Modélisation Géométrique et Infographie Interactive group at l'Institut de Recherche en Informatique de Nantes and l'Ecole Centrale de Nantes, in Nantes, at the University of Toronto, at the School of Computing at the National University of Singapore, at the Laboratoire Image of l'Ecole Nationale Supérieure des Télécommunications in Paris, and he was a visiting researcher with the Computer Aided Design and Manufacturing Group at the Sentralinsitutt for Industriell Forskning (Central Institute for Industrial Research) in Oslo.

He is a UC Berkeley Presidential Chair Fellow, a Warren and Marjorie Minner Faculty Fellow in Engineering Ethics and Professional/Social Responsibility, and an ACM Distinguished Speaker.

Awards
Barsky won an IBM Faculty Development Award and a National Science Foundation Presidential Young Investigator Award.  He was named a Fellow of the American Academy of Optometry (F.A.A.O.)

Books
He is a co-author or author of several books:  An Introduction to Splines for Use in Computer Graphics and Geometric Modeling, Making Them Move: Mechanics, Control, and Animation of Articulated Figures, and Computer Graphics and Geometric Modeling Using Beta-splines. See List of books in computational geometry.

Conference Program Chairs
He was the Technical Program Committee Chair for the ACM SIGGRAPH '85 conference held in San Francisco on July 22-26, 1985 and Program Co-chair of Pacific Graphics 2000 held in Hong Kong on October 3–5, 2000.
He was the Technical Program Committee Chair for the ACM SIGGRAPH '85 conference held in San Francisco on July 22-26, 1985 and Program Co-chair of Pacific Graphics 2000 held in Hong Kong on October 3–5, 2000.

Research
Along with You-Dong Liang, he was an author and namesake of the efficient “Liang-Barsky algorithm” for clipping in computer graphics.

Barsky created the Beta-spline curve and surface representation which introduced the concept of geometric continuity for smoothness and Gn notation to the fields of computer-aided geometric design and geometric modeling.

He introduced vision-realistic rendering to simulate human vision based on ocular measurements of an individual. Using these measurements, synthetics images are generated.  This process modifies input images to simulate the appearance of the scene for the individual.

That work led to an investigation with Fu-Chung Huang  of how to display images to compensate for the specific optical aberrations of the viewer, resulting in vision-correcting displays.  Given the measurements of the optical aberrations of a user’s eye, a vision correcting display produces a transformed image that when viewed by this individual will appear in sharp focus. This could impact computer monitors, laptops, tablets, and mobile phones. Vision correction could be provided in some cases where eyeglasses are ineffective.  This research was selected by Scientific American as one of 2014's ten annual "World Changing Ideas.”

Barsky developed a novel contact lens design to help restore vision to people with cornea problems.

References

External links
 Brian A. Barsky's home page at U.C. Berkeley
 September 12, 2002 article in New York Times
 Published papers

Living people
American computer scientists
Canadian computer scientists
Computer graphics researchers
Computer graphics professionals
McGill University Faculty of Science alumni
Cornell University alumni
University of Utah alumni
UC Berkeley College of Engineering faculty
Year of birth missing (living people)